Benbadhanabongse, Prince of Phichai (13 September 1882 – 11 November 1909) was a Prince of Siam, a member of the Siamese (later Thailand) royal family. He originated the House of Benbadhana. He was a son of Chulalongkorn, King Rama V of Siam.

Early life and work
Prince Benbadhanabongse was born on 13 September 1882, in the compound of the Grand Palace, Bangkok. He was the 38th child of King Chulalongkorn, and his mother was The Noble Consort (Chao Chom Manda) Morakot Phenkul, daughter of Lord (Phraya) Mahindrasakdi Dhamrong and Dame (Thanpuying) Hunn Phenkul. He had an elder sister, Princess Chudharatana Rajakumari.

He studied agricultural studies in the United Kingdom in 1903, while he was only 19 years old. After graduating, he began working as the secretary officer in the Ministry of Education. In 1902, King Chulalongkorn promoted the country's silk-silverware and weaving industry. He hired Dr. Kametaro Toyama from the University of Tokyo to teach the Japanese practice of silk and weaving to Siamese students. King Chulalongkorn established a silk-weaving factory in the sub-district of Sala-Daeng, under the control of the Ministry of Education. Later on 30 September 1903, the ministry included the productive division, the division of animal husbandry, and the silk-weaving pillow station, created as the "Department of Silk Technicians". Prince Benbadhanabongse became the first director of the department.

The main responsibility of the Department of Silk Technicians the School of Sericulture, which was established in November 1903 at Dusit Palace. On 16 January 1904, there was another School of Sericulture in Pathum Wan, for the purpose of creating a specialist research and training of Thai employees. Later this school developed into the current Kasetsart University.

Prince Benbadhanabongse was given the royal title from his father as "Kromma Muen Phichai Mahintharodom", or translated as The Prince of Phichai on 2 October 1904. He was given the rank of Kromma Meun, the fifth level of the Krom ranks.

Personal life
Prince Benbadhanabopngse was interested in Thai music instruments, being able to play almost every type of instrument. He created the Thai classical music band "Prince Ben's band". After returning from the United Kingdom, he visited Chiang Mai. He met the Chiang Mai princess Chomchuen of Chiang Mai, daughter of Prince Sambandhavongse Dharmalanka of Chiang Mai and Princess Ghamyon of Lamphun, and they began a relationship. Prince Benbadhanabongse requested the governor of Chiang Mai to negotiate with Prince Sambandhavongse about a marriage, but the proposal was rejected by Prince Sambandhavongse.

He began composing the song called Lao Duang Duen in loving memory to his loved one. He performed this song whenever he missed the Princess of Chiang Mai.

Later King Chulalongkorn prepared the marriage between the Prince and Princess Vanna Vilaya Kritakara, daughter of Krisdabhinihara, Prince Nares Voraridhi on 30 June 1903. The couple had two children;
 Princess Barnabenkhae Benbadhana (11 September 1905 – 1 July 1974) later relinquished the royal title, and married Mom Rajawongse Banluesakdi Kritakara, had a son and two daughters
 Prince Baobenbadhana Benbadhana (9 May 1906 – 10 January 1960) married Mom Luang Bochitra Patamasingha, had two sons.

Prince Benbadhanabongse died on 11 November 1909, at the age of 27.

Royal decorations
  Knight of The Most Illustrious Order of the Royal House of Chakri
  Knight Grand Cordon (Special Class) of The Most Illustrious Order of Chula Chom Klao:

Ancestry

References
 http://freepages.genealogy.rootsweb.com/~royalty/thailand/i672.html

1880s births
1909 deaths
19th-century Thai people
Thai male Phra Ong Chao
Benbadhana family
Knights Grand Cordon of the Order of Chula Chom Klao
Children of Chulalongkorn
19th-century Chakri dynasty
20th-century Chakri dynasty
Sons of kings